List of Chinese–Japanese false friends refer to words that are similar but have a significantly different and distinct meaning in Chinese Hanzi and Japanese Kanji. Globally, numerous languages support communication among members of society. The languages used tend to use similar words that bear a different meaning. Apart from the main language; English that is widely used globally, other languages exist words spelled the same but have different meanings and pronunciations. Moreover, there are expressions or words in a given language that consists of the same meaning in all senses. China and Japan have distinct languages that facilitate communication among members of society. Chinese and Japanese are the languages used in the two nations respectively.

History 

Chinese characters were said to have been invented by Cangjie, one of the bureaucrats underneath the legendary Yellow Monarch. Cangjie invented symbols known as zì following an inspired study of the landscape, animals and the galaxy in the sky. zì is the first Chinese character and Cangjie relates it with a mythical story of the day characters were created. People saw crops fall like rain and hear ghosts wail. The modern era supports numerous writing systems that support thousands of characters. Chinese traditional characters define most of the false friends used in society.

Japanese kanji borrows some words from the Chinese language that dictates the relationship between the Japanese kanji and the Chinese logographic. Chinese characters were introduced to Japan through letters, coins, swords, official seals, and decorative seals imported from China. King of Na gold is the earliest import bearing Chinese characters presented to Yamato by Emperor Guangwu of Han. The Japanese of that era had no knowledge of scripts, and hence remained illiterate until the fifth century. 

The earliest Japanese documents were written by Korean officials and bilingual Chinese employed at the Yamoto court. Afterwards, a group of people known as fuhito was organized under the monarch to read and write Chinese characters. Consequently, Yamoto court began sending full-scale diplomatic missions to China that led to increased literacy at the Japanese court. Japanese Kanji could be stenciled onto thin rectangular strips of wood that could aid communication in those centuries.

In the ancient era, the Japanese language had no written form at the time Chinese characters were introduced. As a result, texts were read and written only in Chinese. Heian period (794–1185) facilitated the emergence of a system known as Kanbun that involved the use of Chinese text with diacritical marks that could allow Japanese speakers to read and restructure Chinese sentences. Moreover, Chinese characters came to be used in writing Japanese words that resulted in modern kana syllabaries. Japan adopted the writing system known as man'yogana to write ancient poetry anthology man'yoshu that used a number of Chinese characters. 

In modern Japanese, kanji is integrated into writing systems through content words such as adjectives stems, nouns and verb stems. The growth experienced in the integration of kanji in writing systems has increased the number of false friends existing between the Chinese and Japanese languages. In some instances, kanji is considered difficult to read relating to the context applied. For instance, hiragana and katakana are writing systems which descend from kanji and have characters that are used to write phonetic complements, adjective endings and infected verbs used to disambiguate readings and give simple definitions to some miscellaneous words that are hard to comprehend in the writing systems. 

Chinese characters are among the most widely adopted writing systems. In addition, the Chinese characters are mostly used in learning systems mostly in China and Japan. Consequently, most of the characters used in Japanese kanji adopts their meaning from the Chinese logographic characters. Chinese characters constitute the oldest used system of writing in the world. Consequently, most of these characters are integrated into the learning systems of most nations in East Asia. Functional literacy in written Chinese requires knowledge of between three and four thousand characters as clearly shown in Chinese studies. Japanese kanji and Chinese logographic characters have been simplified through the WWII simplifications in kanji and China respectively. There are numerous national standard lists of characters, pronunciations and forms distinctly defined by Japanese Kanji and Chinese writing systems. In the Japanese language, common characters are written in post-WWII Japan simplified forms. Most uncommon characters are written in Japanese traditional forms that are nearly identical to Chinese traditional forms. 

Following the simplification of the characters used in Japanese and Chinese language, most characters are used with similar pronunciation and structure but have different meaning according to the respective languages.

Cultural effects 
False friends in writing systems occur when words in two distinct languages resemble each other in structural appearance or sound, but have a different meaning. False friends can be identified as homophones although they are culturally bounded since they are defined in two particular languages. False friends have impacts on the cultural definition for the societies using the languages. For instance, the Chinese language uses numerous characters that define its language. Japanese Kanji that emanates from the Chinese traditional characters defines the Japanese language. Consequently, the Japanese language has most of its words borrowed and developed from the Chinese tradition. The two distinct languages tend to share similar linguistic history, which is characterized by the use of homographs in the language. However, the fact that the two languages share similar linguistic history has motivated the usage of similar words in the languages that have distinct meanings. Chinese and Japanese languages use words that are similar but with different pronunciation in their respective languages.

Therefore, while writing, individuals tend to be very careful with false friends especially for the Chinese and Japanese languages that use similar words with different pronunciation and meaning in relation to the respective language. Chinese and Japanese language has numerous false friends. The following is a list of some of the most common false friends that individuals must be mindful when writing them. Some words and expressions are similar but have different pronunciation and meaning in their respective languages. False friends present linguistic homographs and synonyms based on the cultural and societal bound languages.

Among the cultural effects include contresense that occurs when a writer uses a false friend in the context whose meaning is the opposite of the original meaning as presented in the related language. In the current and modern society, writing systems have been improved following the improved number of characters integrated into the writing systems. Writers and learners of the languages both Chinese and Japanese need to be very conscious about the false friends in order to deliver the exact meaning through the written context. The difference in pronunciation and meaning indicates homograph elements in false friends. This supports the fact that the Japanese language is developed from literary Chinese.

While writing contexts, some characters might seem familiar to the writers that they tend to assume they have similar meaning across different cultures. However, such characters might raise different meaning across different cultures due to different definitions. For instance, Chinese linguistic analysis demonstrates different contexts that have varying meaning from the Japanese Kanji despite the fact that it is the source of most Japanese characters. Consequently, readers and writers must be keen while applying such samples of false friends.

Existence of false friends in the languages governs every effort towards generating conversation across dynamic cultures. For instance, Chinese and Japanese cultures have distinct social and cultural activities that define different terminologies that determine the nature of context to be published. A bilingual writer seeking to publish context in Chinese and Japanese language need to be aware of false friends in order to present context that draws similar meaning to both languages. False friends have an impact on the context presented by speakers. While presenting a speech in a bilingual society, speakers need to be aware of false friends to avoid embarrassment. 

Most language learners fall into the false friends trap in the learning process. They give insight on how language changes. Speakers move away from certain meanings towards others considering the meaning of words and characters used in their context. Most of the Chinese and Japanese false friends arise through various actions of semantic change. Since most of the Japanese language characters are borrowed from the Chinese language there is a shift that defines the similarity of the context presented. This motivates the need for being careful while writing since the meaning between the paired languages in very different raising definitions that differ in very distinct contexts. Therefore, false friends have a cultural impact on writing and learning bilingual languages whose characters have some defining similarities.

List of Chinese–Japanese false friends 
This pair of languages has a huge list of false friends that define words used in the two languages but each has distinct meanings. Although there are numerous false friends in this language pair, the list highlights some of the commonly used words in the two distinct languages. False friends might be challenging for learners and writers who have an interest in learning both Chinese and Japanese languages.

Among the commonly used false friends in Japanese and Chinese languages, include:

References

External links 

Chinese characters

Japanese writing system terms

Kanji
Chinese scripts
Logographic writing systems
Writing systems
Japanese writing system
False friends